David Alejandro Molina Guerra (born 14 March 1988) is a retired Honduran football defender who played his entire career for F.C. Motagua in the Honduran national league.

Club career
He played for F.C. Motagua from 2006 to 2014 where he appeared in 100 games and scored 5 goals.

International career
He is also part of the U–23 Honduras national football team that won the 2008 CONCACAF Men's Pre-Olympic Tournament and qualified to the 2008 Summer Olympics.

He made his debut for the national side on 22 May 2008 in a friendly against Belize.

Honours
 National team
 2008 CONCACAF U–23

Statistics

Domestic goals summary

International goals

References

External links

1988 births
Living people
Sportspeople from Tegucigalpa
Association football defenders
Honduran footballers
Honduras international footballers
Footballers at the 2008 Summer Olympics
2009 CONCACAF Gold Cup players
Olympic footballers of Honduras
F.C. Motagua players
Liga Nacional de Fútbol Profesional de Honduras players
Honduras under-20 international footballers
Honduras youth international footballers